Deltobathra is a genus of moths belonging to the subfamily Tortricinae of the family Tortricidae.

Species
Deltobathra autarkia Razowski & Becker, 1999
Deltobathra platamodes Meyrick, 1923

See also
List of Tortricidae genera

References

 , 1923, Exotic Microlepid. 3: 55.
 , 2005, World Catalogue of Insects 5

External links
tortricidae.com

Euliini
Tortricidae genera